Jakop Dalunde (born 2 February 1984) is a Swedish politician who has served as Member of the European Parliament (MEP) for Sweden from 2016 to 2019 and regained his seat after  Brexit in February 2020. He is a member of the Green Party, part of the European Green Party.

Political career
From 2014-2016 Dalunde served as a Member of the Swedish Parliament and defense policy spokesperson for the Green Party. From 2008–2011 he served as a spokesperson for the Young Greens of Sweden.

In the European Parliament, Dalunde served on the Committee on Industry, Research and Energy from 2016 until 2019. Since 2020, he has been a member of the Committee on Transport and Tourism. 

In addition to his committee assignments, Dalunde has been part of the Parliament’s delegations for Russia (2016-2017), Moldova (2016-2017) and India (since 2020). From 2017 until 2019, he was a member of the delegation to the Parliamentary Assembly of the Union for the Mediterranean.

References

Living people
1984 births
Green Party (Sweden) MEPs
MEPs for Sweden 2014–2019
Politicians from Stockholm
MEPs for Sweden 2019–2024